The Emu River is a perennial river for most of its length, located in the north-western region of Tasmania, Australia. It was named by Henry Hellyer, an early explorer who saw emu tracks in the vicinity.

Location and features
The river rises below Companion Hill near Saint Valentines Peak, passes through Companion Reservoir, and flows generally north into Emu Bay at Wivenhoe. The river descends  over its  course.

See also

References

Notes

Rivers of Tasmania
North West Tasmania